Joy English School is a school franchise with over 450 schools in Taiwan, China, and Japan.

Established by Sam Chen and Peggy Huang in 1981, it is one of the oldest and largest chains of English cram schools on the island of Taiwan. Joy English publishes its own materials to accommodate the needs of kindergarten, elementary, and high school students, as well as students taking the TOEIC.

Joy English has been selected by public and private elementary and junior high schools throughout Taiwan to develop textbooks that are approved by the Ministry of Education.

External links
Official site
Joy to the World佳音英語世界雜誌 帶您一探色彩繽粉的印度「侯麗節」
Joy to the world佳音英語世界雜誌一起暢遊長年都是溫熱季節的泰國
贏得專業 改變職涯就從現在開始 兩人同行享九折優惠
Site Mainland China
Taipei Times: English teachers warn of bad treatment in China
Site Japan

Educational institutions established in 1981
Schools in Taiwan
1981 establishments in Taiwan